Alexander Tsiaras is an American photographer, entrepreneur, technology innovator, and journalist whose work has appeared on the cover of over 150 magazines. He is the founder, CEO, and editor-in-chief of TheVisualMD and StoryMD.

Tsiaras’ awards include the World Press Award, Webby Award, and the Satava Award for his work on improving medicine through advanced technology, and his work has been featured on the covers of Time, the New York Times Magazine, Smithsonian, Life magazine, and the London Sunday Times Magazine.

Tsiaras is a prolific speaker who has lectured and keynoted conferences, including the National Library of Medicine (NLM/NIH) Scientific Visualization Conference, TED, TEDMED, Ink Conference (in association with TED India), Google Health Conference "ThinkHealth 2012", and Medicine Meets Virtual Reality (MMVR). He has lectured with Stephen Hawking at the MIT Media Lab.

Some of his most notable publications include From Conception to Birth: A Life Unfolds, Architecture and Design of Man and Woman, and the InVision Guides to Healthy Heart, Sexual Health and Life Blood. His latest releases include Conception to Birth and TheVisualMD Wellness Program, A Scientific Approach to Losing Weight, Preventing Illness and Reversing Chronic Diseases.

Early life and career
 
The son of Greek immigrants who emigrated via Ellis Island to the US after the conclusion of the Second World War, Tsiaras was raised on the stories of his parents’ homeland. His father would seasonally bring the goats south from Northern Macedonia to a small village near Mount Olympus where he met Tsiaras’ mother.

At the age of 19, Tsiaras travelled to his parents' villages in rural Greece to spend a year herding goats. It was here that he was exposed to the extraordinary centuries-old funeral and exhumation rituals that inspired him to record the local practices and independently kickstart his journalism career. Tsiaras co-authored his first book, Death Rituals of Rural Greece (Princeton University Press), in 1972.

“Greeks don’t celebrate life, they celebrate death,” according to Tsiaras. “We don’t celebrate birthdays, we celebrate name days, based on the deaths of saints.

“In these remote Greek villages, they believe that the soul's transcendence to heaven is directly related to the decomposition of the flesh: the more flesh on the bones exposed at the time of the exhumation, the more sins; the less flesh, the less sins,” he added.

1980s 
In the early 1980s, Tsiaras’ work in Greece attracted the attention of the German/US monthly magazine, Geo, who assigned him to travel to his parents' villages to document them through photography. These works, “My Father’s Greece”, were published in Geo in 1982. Geo later collaborated with Tsiaras to help them launch as an international presence using his visual prowess.

After his work abroad, Tsiaras returned to the United States and studied painting and sculpting with the well-known artist Lucas Samaras and sculptor George Segal, but it was the drama of medical intervention that gripped him most. Photographing and documenting the marvel of surgical operations became a point of increasing focus.

Tsiaras’ next move was to teach himself mathematics and physics, and he used this knowledge to start developing his own lenses, including one for a microscope that was used to photograph the first images of human eggs in an in vitro fertilization program. Another lens, designed for use with an endoscope, is capable of photographing a fetus from outside the amniotic sac. Images developed using this lens became cover stories for Life Magazine.

In 1989, Tsiaras realized the potential of computer-generated imagery and learned UNIX, then C and C++ to write his own programs that transferred his knowledge of light moving through physical space to light moving through tissue in virtual space.

Tsiaras formed part of an innovative team that designed 3D imaging technologies capable of analyzing the density of tissues, the results of which could then be extrapolated and segmented to perform surgical operations in advance. They received grants from major groups such as Intel and Apple to further their technology.

“Before this software, [surgeons] would sometimes have to perform the operation maybe four times in order to get it right,” said Tsiaras. “But this way, you can do the measurements in advance and achieve it in one go.”

1990s 
 
By the 1990s, Tsiaras’ work had gotten him noticed by many media groups, which led to appearances and contributions to various books, magazine covers, and CD-ROMs. One publication of Life magazine dedicated the entire issue to Tsiaras’ visualization of the human body, which was unprecedented for the magazine since they had never before focused on only a single contributor for an issue.

Despite having never formally completed any higher-level education, he was approached by Yale School of Medicine, Department of Surgery, with an offer to become an adjunct professor. Working with Yale, he received funding from NASA to write algorithms for virtual surgery so that astronauts could be surgically treated in robotics pods during deep space flights.

As Tsiaras explained, “…if you’re on your way to Mars and when passing by the moon you get an appendicitis attack, you’re going to have to be cut”.

Tsiaras has fused his experience in art, science, technology, journalism, and storytelling to develop groundbreaking medical tech companies.

Beginning in 1988 as Anatomical Travelogue, Tsiaras remolded the company into the more user-friendly TheVisualMD in 1997. A media and technology company based in New York, TheVisualMD was dedicated to writing advanced software that scans the body from the molecular to the larger anatomies, from conception to advanced age.

Richard Saul Wurman, founder of the TED Conferences, described TheVisualMD as “…the perfect marriage of the National Institutes of Health (NIH) and Pixar.”

StoryMD 
 
In 2017, Tsiaras launched a new personalized health platform, StoryMD. This single, unified platform translates user health and wellness data into a visually rich story, allowing users to understand, track, share, and act on the trajectory of their well-being. Using unparalleled visualizations and a library of authoritative health information, StoryMD empowers users to actively understand and manage their health at each stage of the journey. 

StoryMD has collated one of the world’s most complete digital repositories of medical knowledge. The encyclopedic domain boasts over 5,000 health and wellness topics and 35,000 articles, delivered in a highly accessible format that emphasizes relevance to the user. All the information therein has been vetted by authoritative and reliable open sources including the Centers for Disease Control, the National Institutes of Health, and the Food and Drug Administration.

Augmenting this library is a multimedia trove encompassing over 50,000 videos and 75,000 images and interactive tools that detail scientific intricacies in painstaking visual detail.

Emulating Tsiaras’ multidisciplinary background, the StoryMD team marries artist and logician under one umbrella. The collection of scientists, mathematicians, visual designers, programmers, writers, and editors synthesize their work to capture both the aesthetic and technical splendor of medical science.

HealthJournals and the user experience 
StoryMD bridges the divide between the complexities of medical science and the lay public by using an engaging multimedia format that incorporates information written in digestible language.

The platform organizes health topics into over 3,500 HealthJournals, each containing vividly illustrated, information-rich stories on a litany of topics related to conditions, pathologies, treatments, anatomy, and nutrition. There are also HealthJournals covering prevention, insights into interactive biomarkers of risk and strategies to stave off disease, and user-friendly information on a wide range of medications.

The user experience can be further customized through tools that allow users to collect, group, and share the HealthJournals that are most relevant or interesting to them, thereby creating personal collections of the best information and most powerful visuals available. StoryMD Author, a visual editing application, gives users access to the StoryMD visual library to create and share their own HealthJournals.

“StoryMD will revolutionize how we take control of our own health story,” said Tsiaras. “So many of us are seeking factual health information that directly relates to our lives and circumstances.

“Until now, that information had to be cobbled together from different, sometimes unauthenticated sources. StoryMD puts vetted health information directly into the hands of anyone who wants it, enlivens it with our extraordinary visualizations of the human body and its conditions, and allows users to customize their experience based on their situation or interests,” he continued.

“It's the single place where, from conception to advanced age, your personal health and wellness data will live alongside relevant health insights and opportunities for engagement and community-building, empowering you to truly understand and actively manage your health.”

GENESIS suite 
A cornerstone of StoryMD’s offerings is the GENESIS suite, a 300+ HealthJournal collection that provides prospective, expectant, and new parents a better way to understand and manage every aspect of fertility and pregnancy.

GENESIS encapsulates the entire journey of reproduction, from in vitro fertilization to interpreting genetic testing information, through birth, and continuing into toddlerhood and early development.

Personal 
Mr. Tsiaras lives with his wife, son, and dog Kookla in New York City and in rural Pennsylvania.

References

External links

1953 births
Living people
American male journalists
20th-century American painters
American male painters
21st-century American painters
21st-century American male artists
Photographers from New Hampshire
Webby Award winners
Medical illustrators
20th-century American male artists